is a sub-kilometer near-Earth asteroid and potentially hazardous object of the Apollo group, approximately  in diameter. It was first observed by the Near-Earth Asteroid Tracking at Palomar Observatory on 5 October 2004. The asteroid has a notably low sub-lunar Earth-MOID of 0.38 LD. , it has only been observed in Fall 2004.

Orbit and classification 

 is a member of the Apollo group of asteroids, which are Earth-crossing asteroids. They are the largest group of near-Earth objects with approximately 10 thousand known members. It orbits the Sun at a distance of 0.8–4.7 AU once every 4 years and 7 months (1,664 days; semi-major axis of 2.75 AU). Its orbit has an eccentricity of 0.70 and an inclination of 8° with respect to the ecliptic. Due to its highly eccentric orbit it also crosses the orbit of Mars at 1.66 AU. The body's observation arc begins with its first observation at Palomar on 5 October 2004.

However, its orbit is poorly determined, with observations taken over a few weeks in 2004, yielding an orbital certainty of 5 and 6, respectively, with 0 being a well-determined orbit and 9 being an extremely poorly determined orbit. More observations are needed to improve the precision of the asteroid's orbital parameters to determine its potentially hazard it may pose to Earth in the distant future.

Close approaches 

It has the fourth smallest geocentric Minimum Orbital Intersection Distance of any asteroid, after  which exploded in Earth's atmosphere in 2008, 1994 GV, and 2014 AA which also impacted the Earth in 2014. The asteroid, however, will not make any significant close approaches to Earth in at least the next century, as it is expected to pass close to Earth again on 8 October 2114.

Numbering and naming 

This minor planet has neither been numbered nor named by the Minor Planet Center, which requires repeated observations on more than one opposition.

Physical characteristics 

 has an unknown spectral type and could be of siliceous (S-type) or carbonaceous (C-type) composition with high or low albedo, respectively.

Rotation period 

As of 2019, no rotational lightcurve of this asteroid has been obtained from photometric observations. The body's rotation period, pole and shape remain unknown.

Diameter and albedo 

Based on an magnitude-to-diameter conversion and a measured absolute magnitude of 21.8,  measures between 130 and 240 meters in diameter for an assumed geometric albedo of 0.20 (siliceous) and 0.057 (carbonaceous), respectively.

References

External links 
 
 
 

Minor planet object articles (unnumbered)

20041005